Theodore Schick is an American author in the field of philosophy.

His articles have appeared in numerous publications and include topics such as functionalism and its effect on immortality, the logic behind the criteria of adequacy, and applying a scientific approach to the paranormal. In 1994, Schick published How to Think About Weird Things: Critical Thinking for a New Age, which is designed to teach the reader how to think critically about extraordinary claims.

Biography
He received a B.A. from Harvard University and a Ph.D. in philosophy from Brown University. Currently, he is a professor of philosophy at Muhlenberg College and the director of the Muhlenberg Scholars program.  His upper-level courses include the philosophy of mind, biomedical ethics, and the philosophy of science.  He plays lead guitar in the band Doctors of Rock at Muhlenberg College.

Bibliography
 with Lewis Vaughn: Doing Philosophy: An Introduction Through Thought Experiments, .

See also
American philosophy
List of American philosophers

External links
 Theodore W. Schick, Jr., Department Chair

American skeptics
Living people
Year of birth missing (living people)
20th-century American philosophers
21st-century American philosophers
Critics of parapsychology
Harvard University alumni
Brown University alumni
Muhlenberg College faculty